Pembroke is a city and county seat in Bryan County, Georgia, United States.  As of the 2020 census, the population of the city was 2,513.  It is located approximately 35 miles west of Savannah, Georgia, and approximately 20 miles south of Statesboro, Georgia.

History
Pembroke was founded in 1892 as a railroad town and turpentine shipping center. It was named after early resident Pembroke Whitfield Williams. It was incorporated in 1905.  The county seat was voted to be moved from Clyde to Pembroke in 1935, with the first County Commissioners session in Pembroke taking place on February 15, 1937.

On April 9, 1998, a F3 tornado damaged the city.  It killed two people and injured 17 others along its path. 

On April 5, 2022, an EF2 tornado struck the town, causing heavy damage to many structures, trees, and power lines. The tornado would later strengthen to EF4 intensity in Black Creek, causing catastrophic damage, killing one person, and injuring 12 others.

The Pembroke Historic District is listed in the National Register of Historic Places.

Geography

Demographics

Pembroke is part of the Savannah Metropolitan Statistical Area.

2020 census

As of the 2020 United States census, there were 2,513 people, 887 households, and 656 families residing in the city.

2000 census
As of the census of 2000, there were 2,379 people, 819 households, and 630 families residing in the city. The racial makeup of the city was 59.56% White, 38.04% African American, 0.13% Native American, 0.42% Asian, 0.34% Pacific Islander, 0.34% from other races, and 1.18% from two or more races. Hispanic or Latino of any race were 1.64% of the population.

There were 819 households, out of which 38.6% had children under the age of 18 living with them, 51.5% were married couples living together, 21.1% had a female householder with no husband present, and 23.0% were non-families. 20.5% of all households were made up of individuals, and 8.8% had someone living alone who was 65 years of age or older.  The average household size was 2.82 and the average family size was 3.24.

In the city, the population was spread out, with 31.1% under the age of 18, 9.4% from 18 to 24, 27.8% from 25 to 44, 21.7% from 45 to 64, and 9.9% who were 65 years of age or older.  The median age was 32 years. For every 100 females, there were 92.5 males.  For every 100 females age 18 and over, there were 87.6 males.

The median income for a household in the city was $28,456, and the median income for a family was $33,281. Males had a median income of $28,879 versus $19,632 for females. The per capita income for the city was $13,795.  About 22.4% of families and 23.7% of the population were below the poverty line, including 33.9% of those under age 18 and 15.9% of those age 65 or over.

Education 
The Bryan County School District holds pre-school to grade twelve, and consists of five elementary schools, two middle schools and two high schools. The district has 328 full-time teachers and over 5,552 students.
Bryan County High School

Richmond Hill High School
Bryan County Middle School
Richmond Hill Middle School

Bryan County Elementary School
George Washington Carver Elementary School
Lanier Primary School
Richmond Hill Elementary School
Richmond Hill Primary School

Notable people
Pembroke was the birthplace of jazz musician Jabbo Smith.

References

External links
 City of Pembroke official website

Cities in Georgia (U.S. state)
Cities in Bryan County, Georgia
County seats in Georgia (U.S. state)
Savannah metropolitan area